Colonel Augustine Warner Jr. (1642 – June 19, 1681) was a British politician, planter, and landowner. He served in the House of Burgesses 1666–77 and was its Speaker in two separate sessions in 1676 and 1677, before and after Bacon's Rebellion. He then served on the Governor's Council from about October 1677 until his death.

Warner is the last common ancestor of George Washington and King Charles III.

Early life
Augustine Warner Jr. was born on June 3, 1642. He was the only son of Augustine Warner Sr., who in 1628 had settled in the  Virginia Colony and by 1642 patented the plantation called "Austin's Desire" in Gloucester County, building Warner Hall on the property. The elder Warner served on the Council from 1659 until his death in 1674.

The younger Warner went to London in 1658 and attended the Merchant Taylors' School. He returned to Virginia after finishing his education and married Mildred Reade, daughter of George Reade, Secretary of the Virginia Colony. They settled on a farm in Gloucester County, living there until he inherited Warner Hall in 1674 and assumed his father's position as Colonel of the local county militia.

Bacon's Rebellion
In March 1676 the General Assembly called by Governor Sir William Berkeley in 1661 held its last session. Warner was elected Speaker, replacing Robert Wynne, who died the previous year. On May 10, as the Nathaniel Bacon crisis was building, Berkeley dissolved the House of Burgesses and called new elections. It is not known if Warner served in the new House that met in June.

Fighting began in late July. Warner remained loyal to Berkeley, joining his forces. Bacon captured Jamestown and burned it on September 19, then crossed the York River and seized Warner Hall. Bacon died in October, but the rebellion continued until early January 1677.

Warner served on a court-martial headed by Berkeley on January 11, 1677. Berkeley called for elections, and Warner was elected Speaker of the new House when it convened in February. The Assembly met until early April. It revoked all acts of the June 1676 Assembly, and then reenacted some.

Later years
In late September – early October 1677 Warner was appointed to the Council. Although he was aligned with the "Green Spring faction" of Berkeley loyalists after Berkeley's removal as governor, he was not removed from the Council, unlike such diehards as Philip Ludwell and Thomas Ballard.

Warner sued William Byrd I, a sometime ally of Bacon, for the damage the rebels had done to Warner Hall. Byrd claimed in his defense that he was Bacon's captive, not his supporter, and was not responsible.

Warner died June 19, 1681, and was interred at Warner Hall.

Legacy and descendants
Warner Hall, although looted in Bacon's Rebellion discussed above, survives today and has been listed on the National Register of Historic Places since 1980. Abingdon Church, the second building built on land Warner donated for spiritual purposes, also remains in use today, although with periods of disuse and disrepair, and has been listed on the National Register since 1970. Warner also has many descendants and is the common ancestor of George Washington and Queen Elizabeth II. His daughter Mildred was the grandmother of Washington, while his daughter Mary was an ancestor of the Queen's mother, Elizabeth Bowes-Lyon. Warner was also the great-great-grandfather of explorer Meriwether Lewis.

Notes

References

1642 births
1681 deaths
People educated at Merchant Taylors' School, Northwood
People from Gloucester County, Virginia
Speakers of the Virginia House of Burgesses
Virginia Governor's Council members